The Northern Puppy Derby is a greyhound racing competition held annually at Newcastle Stadium. The race is confined to puppies (greyhounds under the age of two years old).

It was inaugurated in 1994 at Sunderland Stadium but was switched to sister track Newcastle in 2010. The event was traditionally held in October but from 2022 was held during February.

Past winners

Sponsors
1994-1994 Dransfield
2019-2019 Alconex
2021-present Arena Racing Company

Venues & Distances
1995-2009 (Sunderland 450 metres)
2010-present (Newcastle 480 metres)

References

Greyhound racing competitions in the United Kingdom
Sport in Newcastle upon Tyne
Recurring sporting events established in 1994